Shivraj Singh Chouhan (Also known as Mama, born 5 March 1959) is an Indian politician and member of the Bharatiya Janata Party. He is serving as the 17th and current Chief Minister of Madhya Pradesh since 2020 and again from 2005 to 2018 and a Member of Legislative Assembly in Madhya Pradesh from Budhni since 2006 and again from 1990 to 1991.He is the longest serving Chief Minister of Madhya Pradesh. He was also the former National Vice President of Bharatiya Janata Party from 2019 to 2020, a member of the Parliamentary Board and a member of the Central Election Committee of the Bharatiya Janata Party.He was the National President of Bharatiya Janata Yuva Morcha from 2000 to 2002.He was also Member of Lok Sabha representing Vidisha from 1991 to 2005.As a leader of the BJP, Chouhan served as General Secretary and President of Madhya Pradesh state unit.He joined the Rashtriya Swayamsevak Sangh in 1972,as a 13-year-old.He is known for launching the schemes Ladli Lakshmi Yojana and Beti Bachao Abhiyan.

Early life and education
Shivraj Singh Chouhan was born in a Kirar family to Prem Singh Chouhan and his wife Sundar Bai Chouhan in the Jait village of Sehore district, and belongs to the Kirar community. He is a gold medalist in M. A. (Philosophy) from Barkatullah University Bhopal. He is an agriculturist by profession.

Early political career
His early political career can be defined as up to the point of his first election to the Lok Sabha. He was elected President of the Model School Students Union in 1975. From 1976 to 1977, he participated in underground movement against the Emergency and was imprisoned in Bhopal Jail for some time.

In his early political career, he has also been:
 A convener of Akhil Bhartiya Keshariya Vahini from 1991 to 1992
 A Member of Committee on Labour and Welfare from 1993 to 1996
 A Member of Hindi Salahkar Samiti from 1994 to 2000.

Political career

Chouhan was first elected to the State Assembly from Budhni Constituency in 1990. He was elected a Member of Parliament for the first time in his career in 10th Lok Sabha from Vidisha Constituency in the following year.

In 1996, he was re-elected to the 11th Lok Sabha (his second term). He was Member of Committee on Urban and Rural Development and Member of Consultative Committee, Ministry of Human Resources Development and Member of Committee on Urban and Rural Development from 1996 to 1997 and Member of Committee on Urban and Rural Development, General Secretary of BJP, Madhya Pradesh from 1997 to 1998.

Again in 1998, he was re-elected to 12th Lok Sabha (third term). He was Member of Committee on Urban and Rural Development and its Sub-Committee on Ministry of Rural Areas and Employment from 1998 to 1999.

His fourth term in the 13th Lok Sabha was from 1999. He was member of Committee on Agriculture from 1999 to 2000, member of Committee on Public Undertakings from 1999 to 2001, and National President of Bhartiya Janta Yuva Morcha from 2000 to 2003. He was also the Chairman of House Committee (Lok Sabha) and National Secretary of Bhartiya Janta Party.

The BJP swept Madhya Pradesh in the Assembly elections of December 2003. At that time, Shivraj Singh contested polls unsuccessfully against the incumbent Chief Minister Digvijaya Singh from Raghogarh.

He was a member of Consultative Committee, ministry of Communications from 2000 to 2004. He was re-elected to 14th Lok Sabha (5th term) in 2004, with a margin of over 260,000 votes. He was member of Committee on Agriculture, member of Joint Committee on Offices of Profit, National General Secretary of BJP, Secretary of Parliamentary Board, and Secretary (Central Election Committee). He also headed Housing Committee of Lok Sabha, and was a member of Committee on Ethics.

Chief Minister of Madhya Pradesh

As the state BJP President, Chouhan was chosen to become the Chief Minister of Madhya Pradesh on 30 November 2005. He contested a by-election from Budhni assembly constituency the following year, winning his old seat by a margin of over 36,000 votes.

In 2008, Chouhan retained his Budhni seat by over 41,000 votes, and with it, led the BJP to a second consecutive victory in the state. On 12 December 2008, he was sworn in for his second term.

On 8 December 2013, Chouhan won Legislative Assembly elections from Budhni by the margin of 84805 from a candidate of Congress. He was also elected as Chief Minister of MP for a third term.

On 12 December 2018, after failing to gain a majority in the 2018 Madhya Pradesh assembly election, Chouhan resigned as Chief Minister. He once again took oath as the Chief Minister of Madhya Pradesh on 23 March 2020 after 22 Congress MLA's resigned along with Jyotiraditya Scindia resulting in the collapse of the Kamal Nath government.

Awards and recognition
 2011 NDTV Indian of the year award - Leader of New India (development)
2016 Suryoday Manavta Seva Sanman award.
Champions of Change (award) 2022

See also
 Shivraj Singh Chouhan Third ministry (2013–2018)

References

External links

 Shivraj Singh Chouhan (personal)

|-

|-

1959 births
Living people
Chief ministers from Bharatiya Janata Party
People from Madhya Pradesh
India MPs 2004–2009
Chief Ministers of Madhya Pradesh
People from Vidisha
People from Sehore district
India MPs 1999–2004
India MPs 1998–1999
India MPs 1996–1997
India MPs 1991–1996
Madhya Pradesh MLAs 1990–1992
Madhya Pradesh MLAs 2003–2008
Madhya Pradesh MLAs 2008–2013
Lok Sabha members from Madhya Pradesh
Madhya Pradesh MLAs 2013–2018
Bharatiya Janata Party politicians from Madhya Pradesh
Rashtriya Swayamsevak Sangh members
Madhya Pradesh MLAs 2018–2023